Maurice Halbwachs (11 March 1877 – 16 March 1945) was a French philosopher and sociologist known for developing the concept of collective memory. Halbwachs also contributed to the sociology of knowledge with his La Topographie Legendaire des Évangiles en Terre Sainte; study of the spatial infrastructure of the New Testament. (1951)

Early life and education

Born in Reims, France, Halbwachs attended the École Normale Supérieure in Paris. There he studied philosophy with Henri Bergson, who had a major influence on his thinking. Halbwachs' early work on memory was in some measure pursued to coincide with Bergson's view on the subject of memory being a particularly personal and subjective experience.  Bergson taught Halbwachs for three years. He then aggregated in Philosophy in 1901. He taught at various lycées before traveling to Germany in 1904, where he studied at the University of Göttingen and worked on cataloging Leibniz's papers until 1907. He was nominated to co-edit an edition of Leibniz's work which never came to fruition.

He returned to France in 1905 and met Émile Durkheim, who sparked his interest in sociology. Initially, when meeting Durkheim, Halbwachs was looking for advice on how to move from his previous focus on Philosophy to Sociology. Halbwachs also began to focus on scientific objectivism rather than his Bergsonian Individualism. He soon joined the editorial board of L'Année Sociologique, where he worked with François Simiand and Lévy-Bruhl editing the Economics and Statistics sections. In 1909 he returned to Germany to study Marxism and economics in Berlin. 

He also had a son, Pierre Halbwachs, who influenced Deleuzian theory in the 1940s.

Teaching and positions
Throughout World War I, Halbwachs worked at the War Ministry. Beginning in 1919, shortly after the end of the war, he became professor of sociology and pedagogy at the University of Strasbourg (1919). He remained in this position for over a decade, taking leave for a year in 1930 as a visiting professor at the University of Chicago, when he was called to the Sorbonne in 1935. There he taught sociology and worked closely with Marcel Mauss and served as the editor of Annales de Sociologie, the successor journal to L'Année Sociologique. He taught as a professor of sociology in Sorbonne, Paris from 1935-1943 and a professor of social psychology at the College de France from 1943 until death. From 1935 until his death he also served as the secretary-general of Annales de Sociologie. In 1944 he received one of France's highest honors, a chair at the Collège de France in Social Psychology. During this time, Halbwachs dedicated his time to in-depth research in the field where sociology and psychology overlap to provide a bit of a timeline.

Death
A longtime socialist, Halbwachs was detained by the Gestapo in Paris in July, 1944 after protesting the arrest of his Jewish father-in-law. He was deported to the concentration camp, Buchenwald, where he died of dysentery in February 1945.

In 1940, Halbwachs' brother in-law, Georges Basch committed suicide. His parents in-law Victor and Mme Basch aged 84 years old at the time were murdered by Germans.

Part of his books were offered by his widow to the library of the Centre d'études sociologiques and are now held at the Human and Social Sciences Library Paris Descartes-CNRS.

Towards the end of his life, Halbwachs was recognized for his contributions to sociology. He was elected into the Conservative Academie des Sciences Morales et Politiques. He was also recognized as the Vice President of the French Psychological Society, while also being called to chair at Sorbonne. 

In 1950, his work on collective memory was published posthumously by his daughter.

Main ideas
Halbwachs' most important contribution to the field of sociology came in his book La Mémoire collective, 1950 ("The Collective Memory"), in which he advanced the thesis that a society can have a collective memory and that this memory is dependent upon the "cadre" or framework within which a group is situated in society. Thus, there is not only an individual memory but also a group memory that exists outside of and lives beyond the individual. An individual's understanding of the past is strongly linked to this group consciousness because every person can contribute a different memory or perspective to the collective group memory. Group memory is also different for every group that experiences a certain event, therefore "every group has its own collective memory and that collective memory differs from the collective memory of other groups. This idea of memory being pursued proves people's expression of commemoration in our culture. Commemoration offers collective memory tie to society and its conceptions where physical monuments and rituals fix and affirm collectivity. 

Halbwachs Collective Memory includes two laws governing how this form of memory will evolve: a Law of Fragmentation, and a Law of Concentration.

Halbwachs also wrote an important book on suicide, Les Causes du suicide, 1930 ("The Causes of Suicide"). In this book he followed the footsteps of his mentor Émile Durkheim, expanding and elaborating upon the former's theories on suicide. Specifically, he focused on ideas such as, the ways in which rural and urban styles of life explain variations in suicide rates. Halbwachs also continued to further Durkheim's conceptualization of how specific family styles and religious backgrounds alter rates of suicide.

Halbwachs included in his Les Cadres Sociaux de la Memoire (1952) the significance of the collective memory operating on the systems of family, religion and social communities.

Halbwachs takes an interesting perspective regarding the relationship between memory and history. He believed that memory and history oppose each other when it comes to reliability. Memory can be transformed based on perspective, which makes it a questionable form of scholarly appreciation for the past. Whereas historians analyze history from a completely unbiased perspective, analyzing it in a critical way from a distance.

Halbwachs contributed to the world of social psychology as well with his thesis on La Classe ouvrière et les niveaux de vie which translates to, "The Working Class and the Standards of Living". This work allowed Halbwachs to analyze and observe how working-class families managed their budgets. He discovered that families and individuals not only plan out their budget for what they need in the moment but what they also need in the future, which forces them to put into perspective what is necessary in the moment. His research is a modification of Durkheim's theory of collective representation.

Published works
Halbwachs, Maurice, On collective memory, Chicago, The University of Chicago Press, 1992
translated from: Les cadres sociaux de la mémoire, Paris, Presses Universitaires de France, 1952, originally published in Les Travaux de L'Année Sociologique, Paris, F. Alcan, 1925
edited, translated and introduction by Lewis A. Coser, includes a translation of the conclusion of: La Topographie légendaire des évangiles en terre sainte: étude de mémoire collective, Paris, Presses Universitaires de France, 1942
Halbwachs, Maurice, The collective memory, New York, Harper & Row Colophon Books, 1980, 182 pages
pdfs of chapters 1 and 2 available (pp. 22–49 and 50-87) on UCSB Collective Memory seminar website
translated from: La mémoire collective, Paris, Presses Universitaires de France, 1950
Complete synthesis on all of his observations of memory
Published after his death
introduction by Mary Douglas, includes a translation of: ‘La mémoire collective chez les musiciens’, Revue philosophique, no. 3 – 4 (1939)
Halbwachs, Maurice, La topographie légendaire des évangiles en Terre sainte, 1941
Reprinted in 2017, can be found on Amazon
Studies how memory is changed over a period of time in a single-setting
Complete synthesis on all of his observations of memory
Published after his death
Halbwachs, Maurice, The Psychology of Social Class, London, Forgotten Books, 2017
Reprinted Classic available on Amazon in both hard and paperback copies
Halbwachs, Maurice, Les causes du suicide, Paris, Presses Universitaries de France, 1930

Further reading
 Michel Verret, Lectures sociologiques: Bourdieu, Passeron, Hoggart, Halbwachs, Janet, Le Play, Girard, Naville, Paris, Harmattan, 2009.
 Dietmar Wetzel, Maurice Halbwachs, Konstanz, UVK Verlagsgesellschaft, 2009.
 Marie Jaisson and Christian Baudelot, eds,  Maurice Halbwachs, sociologue retrouvé, Paris, Rue d’Ulm, 2007.
 Annette Becker,  Maurice Halbwachs, un intellectuel en guerres mondiales 1914-1945, Paris. Agnès Viénot, 2003.
 Gérard Namer, Halbwachs et la mémoire sociale, Paris, L’Harmattan, 2000.

References

External links
 Timeline of Halbwachs's life  
https://www.cmh.ens.fr/ (Center created in Memory today) 
Biographical Video

1877 births
1945 deaths
Writers from Reims
École Normale Supérieure alumni
Executed writers
French philosophers
University of Chicago faculty
University of Göttingen alumni
Academic staff of the University of Paris
Academic staff of the University of Strasbourg
French people who died in Buchenwald concentration camp
French civilians killed in World War II
French sociologists
French male non-fiction writers
Sociomusicologists
Deaths from dysentery